LF-Routes (Landelijke Fietsroutes, Dutch for countrywide cycling routes) are long-distance cycling routes that form a network in the Netherlands and Belgium. The routes, criss-crossing both countries, are primarily intended for recreational multi-day bike tours, such as cycling holidays. Some routes are also part of a wider international network.

Most of the LF routes have been signposted in two directions, inscribing one direction with the letter "a", the other with the letter "b": the North Sea Route LF1 southbound from Den Helder to French Boulogne-sur-Mer is called LF1a, while in the other direction it is called LF1b.

History
In 1987, Dutch cyclists' organisations founded a "countrywide cycling platform" to create a network of long-distance cycling routes throughout the Netherlands. This platform published maps and guides and started signposting its routes in 1990.

Belgium introduced its first long-distance route, not yet called "LF" by that time, in 1964: it connected youth hostels and was therefore called Jeugdherbergenroute, which later became the  LF50. Belgium signposted its first LF-route in 1990 as well (the LF1 North Sea Route) and two years later, the GR organisation took over the planning of Belgian LF-routes.

At the maximum extent, both countries had created a network of 36 routes, of which 5 were only in Belgium, 15 in the Netherlands and 16 in both. Some routes also extend into France and Germany. However, due to the expansion of the numbered-node cycle network, Belgium reduced its official network in 2012 (routes marked ) and the Netherlands is doing the same between 2017 and 2021 (routes marked ).

Routes

Tours from combined LF-Routes
Although a network like the Belgo-Dutch LF routes enable almost endless combinations of sections, a few themed routes have been officially established:

See also
Numbered-node cycle network, a second parallel signage system, allowing users to select arbitrary routes
EuroVelo
German Cycling Network, the national cycling route network of Germany
National Cycle Network, the national cycling route network of the United Kingdom

Notes

References

External links
 Long-distance cycle routes on Nederland Fietsland website
 National LF network on Holland-Cycling.com

Cycleways in Belgium
Cycleways in the Netherlands
National cycling route networks
Long-distance cycling routes